Hans Enn (born 10 May 1958) is an Austrian former alpine skier and Olympic medalist. At the 1980 Olympics in Lake Placid Enn was bronze medalist in the giant slalom.

References

External links
 

1958 births
Living people
Austrian male alpine skiers
Olympic alpine skiers of Austria
Olympic bronze medalists for Austria
Olympic medalists in alpine skiing
Medalists at the 1980 Winter Olympics
Alpine skiers at the 1980 Winter Olympics